James Fowler  (11 December 1828 – 10 October 1892), known as 'Fowler of Louth', is best known as a Victorian English church architect and associated with the restoration and renovation of churches. However, he was also the architect of a wide variety of other buildings. A listing of his work compiled in 1991 traced over 210 buildings that he designed or restored. He is known to be the architect for 24 new churches and his work also included 40 vicarages or rectories, 13 schools, four almshouses, a Savings Bank, a convalescent home and hospital as well as country houses and estate housing. Most of Fowler’s work was in Lincolnshire and particularly around Louth, but he also worked in the East Riding of Yorkshire, Nottinghamshire, Staffordshire, Suffolk, London, Sussex and Devon.

Career and architectural practice
Fowler was born in Lichfield. He was a pupil of Lichfield architect Joseph Potter junior. He came to Louth in 1849, when he was employed in the construction of the Louth House of Correction (demolished 1885). He was probably working for James Sandby Padley, who was the County Surveyor for the Lincolnshire parts of Lindsey. He undertook other work for Padley, including illustrations of the Lincoln Greyfriars in Padley's Selections from the Ancient Monastic Ecclesiastical and Domestic edifices of Lincolnshire which was published in 1851.  At Louth he was initially in partnership with Joseph Maughan, a surveyor and lithographer in Grimsby. The partnership lasted from 1851 until June 1859. On dissolution, it was agreed that the Surveying Department will hereafter be conducted by Mr. Maughan, and the Architectural Department by Mr. Fowler, at their usual places of business in both towns (Grimsby and Louth).  Fowler had probably continued the practice of Charles John Carter, a Louth architect and surveyor, who had died in 1851.

Fowler was elected FRIBA in 1864. Amongst his pupils was Ernest William Farebrother, an architect who worked in Grimsby.  He was a Surveyor for the Diocese of Lincoln between 1871 and 1886, and was for five terms the mayor of Louth. The Grimsby architect John James Cresswell worked as an articled assistant and then principal assistant to Fowler between 1877 and 1884.

Works

Domestic buildings

Houses

Dalby – Dalby Hall (1856)
Louth. Riversmead (1862). An example of a town house by Fowler. Contrasting polychrome brickwork with banding and decorative voussiors. Typical gothic arched entrance.
Market Rasen – Grammar School, Headmaster's House (1863)
Langton-by-Partney – Langton Hall (1869)
Stamford – Browne's Hospital (1870)
Stamford – Warden's House (ca. 1870)
Trinity Estates, West Retford. In the 1870s Fowler laid out housing for the Trinity Hospital in Reford. An example of his designs is Lorne House, Queen Street.

Rectories and Vicarages
Amcotts – Rectory (1882 and 1888)
Goxhill – The Old Vicarage (1872–73)
Gunness – The Old Rectory (1864–66)
Gunness – Stable block (1864–66)
Hatton – Old Rectory (1871). South of the church. Red brick, like the church.
Irby – Old Rectory (1883)
Odstock, Wiltshire – Old Rectory (1869)
Redbourne – The Old Vicarage and Coach House (1861)
Utterby – Rectory (1863)
Waddingham – Old Stainton (was The Old Rectory) (1860). Rock faced limestone with ashlar dressings. L-plan  with three bay  frontage.   Each bay has gables with stepped courses up the verges. A central three light mullioned window with chamfered surround has a pent roof with fish scale slates, supported by curved timber brackets.  On the left side elevation there a Gothic doorway with moulded reveals and head. The hood mould has floriate label stops and rise to a finial. Above the doorway is a panel with cusped and floriated surround containing a stone scroll inscribed with ‘’Nunc huic nunc illi’’. To the right is a chimney breast into which is set a shield shaped plaque with the date of 1860, beneath a ducal coronet. 
West Butterwick – The Old Vicarage (1863)
Willoughby – Rectory (1875)
Withcall – Old Rectory (1869)
Wroot – Rectory (1878)

Almshouses

Louth – Orme Almshouses (1885)

Louth, Bedehouses Gospelgate. Almshouses on Gospelgate, founded in 1551 and sometimes referred to as King Edward VI's Hospital or Our Lady Bede House as the land formerly belonged to the Guild of St. Mary. The current Grade II listed neo-Tudor building by Fowler in 1868-69.

Fotherby – Allenby Almshouses (1869)

Browne's Hospital, Stamford. 1870. Largely rebuilt by Fowler. Only the S range and part of the west cloister are by Fowler, who rebuilt the rest around an enlarged courtyard.

 Holy Trinity Hospital, West Retford.  In 1832–4 the present Hospital was built to the design of Edward Blore. In 1872, Fowler (who had earlier worked on West Retford Church) was commissioned to design a new chapel and audit room. This was added to the centre of the building and at the ground floor, reusing the former common room and converting the space into a chapel. He also added the clock tower. The Hospital is Listed Grade II.

Schools

Caistor – Caistor Primary School and School House (1859–60)
East Ravendale – School
Louth – parts of Edward VI Grammar School (1866)
Market Rasen – De Aston School (1862), red brick headmaster's house with associated school buildings.

Public buildings
Grimsby – Town Hall (1861–63). Constructed to designs by Bellamy and Hardy of Lincoln and the London architect John Giles. Fowler acted as superintending architect during construction.
Horncastle High Street – Corn Exchange by Maugham and Fowler (1855). Erected in 1856 at a cost of about £3500, was a handsome edifice of brick with stone facings, and included a newsroom, a mechanics' institute with a library, and a hall for assemblies, concerts, and lectures. It was later converted into the Victory Cinema.

Shops

15 Market Place, Louth.c.1865. Venetian Gothic Revival derived style with polychrome decorated brick facade. Formerly the International Stores and now Spar.

Churches

New or completely rebuilt churches, arranged by date of construction 

East Ravendale, St. Martin (1857)
Winceby, St Margaret (1860). Now demolished.
Wold Newton, All Hallows (1862)
Louth, St Michael (1862–3)
Frampton, St. Michael (1863).
Ludford, St Mary & St Peter (1863-5)
Cleethorpes, St Peter (1864–66)
Snitterby, St Nicholas (1866)
Lichfield, St Mary (1868–70)
Lincoln, St Swithin's (1869-87). Nikolaus Pevsner described this as "without doubt his most important church."
Binbrook, Sts Mary and Gabriel (1869)
Hatton, St. Stephen (1870). According to Pevsner this is one of Fowler’s more satisfying small churches. Red brick with bands of stone.

London, Kenley, All Saints (1870–72)
Newington, St Mary (1886)
Temple Bruer, St John (1874)
Spridlington, St Hilary (1875). Erected in 1875 to replace an earlier church, which was dedicated to St Hilary and St Albinus, so named as there were originally two churches in the village; St Hilary and St Albinus. The present church was built in memory of the Rector, Rev H F Hutton, who was incumbent for thirty-two years.
Moorhouses, St Laurence (1875)
Denmead, All Saints (1880; with C.R. Pink)
Alford Cemetery Chapel and curator's lodge (1881). Fowler was architect and Mr. Henry Kidd of Alford the builder, completed October 8, 1881 at a cost of £785. The buildings are joined by a Gothic archway for carriages. The floor is laid with Minton's ornamental tiles, the interior walls are of red brick to the moulded string course, and mixture above, with Gothic panelled arches. There is a bell turret with a bell of 75lb weight.
Sutton-in-Ashfield, St Michael and All Angels', Nottinghamshire (1887) (chancel only)

Renovated and partially rebuilt churches

Benington, Lincolnshire – All Saints (1873)

Benniworth, St Julian
Blyborough, St Alkmund (1877–88)
Brattleby, St Cuthbert (1858)
Clarborough, St John the Baptist
Bucknall, St Margaret (1884)
Claxby – St Mary (1871)
Colsterworth, St John Baptist (1876)
Croxton, St John the Evangelist (1876)
Cuxwold, St Nicholas (1860)
Dalby – St Lawrence and Bishop Edward King (1862)
East Halton, St Peter (1868)
Edlington, St Helen (1859–60)

Fotherby, St Mary (1863)
Frampton, St Michael (1863)
Gedney Hill, Holy Trinity (1875)
Grayingham, St Radegund (1870)

Great Carlton – Church of St John Baptist (1860)
Grimsby – Church of  Holy Trinity and Holy Mary (1878)
Gunby – Church of St Peter (1868–70)
Hagworthingham, Holy Trinity (1859)
Halton Holegate, St Andrew (1866)
Healing, St Peter and St Paul (1874–76)
Heckington, St Andrew (1887–88)
Hibaldstow, St Hybald (1875)
Irby, Saint Andrew (1883)
Laceby, Saint Margaret (1883)
Lenton – St Peter (1879)
Leverton  St Helen (1892)
Louth, St James (1861–69)
Ludborough, St Mary (1858)
Ludford Magna, St Mary and St Peter (1864)
Market Deeping, St Guthlac, 1875 or 1878
Market Rasen, St Thomas (1862)
Mavis Enderby, St Michael (1875)
Miningsby, St Andrew (1878). Demolished 1980.
Moorby, All Saints (1866), Demolished 1983.
Muckton, Holy Trinity (1878–79) Demolished 1983.
Nettleton, St John Baptist (1874)
New Clee, St John (1879)
Newton by Toft – St Michael (1860)
Normanby le Wold, St Peter (1868)
North Coates, St Nicholas (1865)
Old Bolingbroke, St Peter and St Paul (1890)
Ranby – St German (1861)
Rigsby – St James (1863)
Roxby, St Mary (1875)
Saltfleetby by St Peter, St Peter (1877)
Scawby, St Hybald (1870)
Sixhills, All Saints (1869 and 1875)
Skegness – St Clements (1884)
Skegness, St Matthew (1879–80)
Snitterby, St Nicholas (1866)
South Ormsby, St Leonard (1871–72)
South Reston, St Edith (1864–65)
Stainfield  St Andrew
Stewton, St Andrew (1886)
Tealby All Saints (1872)
Thimbleby – St Margaret (1879)
Thoresway, St Mary (1879–80)
Thornton Curtis, St Lawrence (1884)
Toynton St Peter, St Peter (1876)
Upton – All Saints (1874–75 and 1880)
Waithe  St Martin, (1861)
Waltham – Church of All Saints (1867 and 1874)
Willoughby – St Helen. Chancel rebuilt by Fowler.(1880)
Wilsthorpe – St Faith (1869)
Wroot – St Pancras (1878)
Wyham cum Cadeby  All Saints (1886)
Yarburgh St John the Baptist – restoration, 1854–5

Devon
Georgeham, Devon.  St George (1876)

London
Croydon, All Saints (1870–72)

Nottinghamshire
Bole – St John Baptist (1874)
Boughton, St Matthew (1868)
Nuthall – St Patrick, Nottinghamshire (1884)
Retford - St Michael the Archangel (1863).

Wiltshire
Odstock, Wiltshire – St Mary (1870)

Yorkshire
Bainton St Andrew (1866)
Beswick  St Margaret (1871)
Easby – St Agatha (1881)
Harswell, St Peter (1871)
Moor Monkton, Yorkshire. All Saints (1879)
Skipsea, Yorkshire, All Saints (1856–60)

References

Further reading
Jenkins, Simon; England's Thousand Best Churches p. 387; Penguin (2000); 
Gurnham, Richard; History of Lincoln p. 177; Phillimore & Co Ltd (2009);

External links

James Fowler – Church Restorer and Mayor of Louth , rodcollins.com. Retrieved 12 August 2011

1828 births
1892 deaths
English ecclesiastical architects
Architects from Lincolnshire
19th-century English architects
People from Lichfield
People from Louth, Lincolnshire
Fellows of the Royal Institute of British Architects